RNA stands for ribonucleic acid, a biological macromolecule. 

RNA may also refer to:

Organisations
 RNA Society, a scientific society
 Religion Newswriters Association
 Republic of New Afrika, a black nationalist community and political lobby group
 Rochester Numismatic Association
Rohingya National Army
 Romantic Novelists' Association
 The Royal National Agricultural and Industrial Association of Queensland, organiser of the Ekka
 Royal Neighbors of America, an American fraternal order

Other uses
 RNA (journal), a scientific journal
 Radio Nacional de Angola, Angola National Radio
 Ripley and New Albany Railroad, a Mississippi shortline railroad
 RNA Showgrounds, Brisbane

zh:RNA